"Edelweiss" is a show tune from the 1959 Rodgers and Hammerstein musical The Sound of Music. It is named after the edelweiss, (Leontopodium nivale), a white flower found high in the Alps. The song was created for the 1959 Broadway production of The Sound of Music, as a song for the character Captain Georg von Trapp. In the musical, Captain von Trapp and his family sing this song during the concert near the end of Act II.  It is a statement of Austrian patriotism in the face of the pressure put upon him to join the navy of Nazi Germany following the Anschluss (Nazi annexation of their homeland). It is also Captain von Trapp's subliminal goodbye to his beloved homeland, using the flower as a symbol of his loyalty to Austria. In the 1965 film adaptation, the song is also sung by the Captain earlier in the film when he rediscovers music with his children.

This was the final song of Rodgers and Hammerstein's musical collaboration as well as the last song written by Oscar Hammerstein II, who died in August 1960.

Writing
While The Sound of Music was in tryouts in Boston, Richard Rodgers felt Captain von Trapp should have a song with which he would bid farewell to the Austria he knew and loved. Rodgers and Oscar Hammerstein II decided to write an extra song that von Trapp would sing in the festival concert sequence towards the end of the show. As they were writing it, they felt this song could also use the guitar-playing and folk-singing talents of Theodore Bikel, who had been cast as the Captain. The Lindsay and Crouse script provides the metaphor of the simple edelweiss wildflower as a symbol of the Austria that Captain von Trapp, Maria, and their children knew would live on, in their hearts, despite the Nazi annexation of their homeland. The metaphor of this song builds on an earlier scene when Gretl presents a bouquet of edelweiss flowers to Baroness Elsa Schräder, during the latter's visit to the von Trapp household.

Rodgers provided a simple, yet haunting and affecting, waltz-time melody, to the simple Italian style ritornello lyric that Hammerstein wrote about the appearance of the edelweiss flower. "Edelweiss" turned out to be one of the most beloved songs in the musical, as well as one of the best-loved songs by Rodgers and Hammerstein.

"Edelweiss" is the last song Rodgers and Hammerstein wrote together; Hammerstein was suffering from stomach cancer, which took his life nine months after The Sound of Music opened on Broadway.

Film adaptation
Although the stage production uses the song only during the concert sequence, Ernest Lehman's screenplay for the film adaptation uses the song twice. Lehman created a scene that makes extra use of the song. This scene, inspired by a line in the original script by Howard Lindsay and Russel Crouse, calls for Captain von Trapp to sing "Edelweiss" with his children in their family drawing room and rediscover the love he felt for them, with Liesl accompanying him. Lehman also expanded the scope of the song when it was sung in the Salzburg Festival concert scene, so that Captain von Trapp and his family would call on the crowds to join in the song with him, in defiance of the Nazi soldiers posted around the arena.

Christopher Plummer played the part of Captain von Trapp in the film adaptation. However, his singing was overdubbed with the voice of Bill Lee despite Plummer recording the song himself. Plummer’s original vocals were discovered by a fan and first posted on YouTube. The Blu-Ray release included a small portion of Plummer’s un-dubbed performance. However, this version has yet to be released officially in its entirety.

An instrumental version of the song is also heard as the final song played during the party as Maria leaves to return to the abbey at the end of the first half of the film.

Austrian attitudes

The edelweiss is a popular flower in Austria and was featured on the old Austrian 1 schilling coin. It can also now be seen on the 2 cent Euro coin. The flower is protected in Austria and illegal to pick. An "edelweiss" is also worn as a cap emblem by certain Austrian Army and the German Gebirgsjäger (mountain troopers) units stationed in the nearby Bavarian Alps.

In the original run, the musical The Sound of Music was treated with disdain by Austrians, and the song "Edelweiss" has been singled out for criticism. When US President Ronald Reagan quoted the song in 1984 to toast Austrian President Rudolf Kirchschläger, Austrian newspapers complained that the song was full of clichés and called it "kitsch." When the musical premiered on the national stage in Vienna in 2005, one critic called it "boring" and another referred to "Edelweiss" as "an insult to Austrian musical creation." However, attitudes have improved as film tourism became a bigger attraction than Salzburg's attraction for being the birthplace of Wolfgang Amadeus Mozart. When the musical premiered in Salzburg in 2011, most performances were sold out.

Misconceptions

The great popularity of the song has led many of its audience to believe that it is an Austrian folk song or even the official national anthem. However, Austria's official anthem is "Land der Berge, Land am Strome", and the anthem used from 1929 until the Anschluss was "Sei gesegnet ohne Ende".

There is similar confusion about another song co-authored by Hammerstein, "Ol' Man River" from the musical Show Boat, which is widely (though erroneously) believed to be an African-American spiritual. The similarity between the misconceptions about the two songs has been noted by two writers, both of whom see it as testament to Hammerstein's talents. Alyson McLamore, in her book Musical Theater: An Appreciation, writes, "The last song to be written for the show was 'Edelweiss,' a tender little homage to a native flower of Austria that has the effect of authentic Austrian folksong, much as 'Ol' Man River' struck listeners as a genuine African American spiritual." Hugh Fordin, in his biography of Oscar Hammerstein, writes about "the ability of the authors to simulate the quality of an authentic folk song... 'Ol' Man River' had the ring of a black laborer's song... Thirty years later, 'Edelweiss' was widely believed to be an old Austrian song, though Oscar...composed it for the Sound of Music."

Theodore Bikel, in his autobiography, Theo (2002), wrote that, after a performance, he was once approached by a native Austrian who said, "I love that Edelweiss" and then added, with total confidence, "Of course, I have known it for a long time, but only in German".

Another misconception about the song is that it is a real-life Nazi anthem, even though "Edelweiss" is not a pro-Nazi song within the context of The Sound of Music, nor did the song even exist during the Nazi era.

Legal problems
The estates of Rodgers and Hammerstein have not authorized the use of alternative lyrics with the melody of the song, making certain commercial uses of those versions potentially infringing if they do not fall under fair use. Rodgers stated that "he would take legal action against any group" using the "Edelweiss" melody with altered words; the current rightsholders comply with his wishes, refusing to grant permission for these commercial requests, which are "inconsistent with the creators' intentions".

Other versions

Josephine Siao (蕭芳芳) performed a Chinese (Cantonese) version in the 1967 movie Lightning Killer (閃電煞星).
Theodore Bikel, who originated the role of Captain von Trapp on Broadway, performed "Edelweiss" (as a duet with Mary Martin) on the original cast album and included it in his album, In My Own Lifetime – 12 Musical Theater Classics.
The English singer Vince Hill reached #2 in the UK Singles Chart in 1967 with his cover version of the track.
Julie Andrews has recorded it for her Richard Rodgers tribute album Broadway: The Music of Richard Rodgers.
Andy Conaghan recorded the song for ABC Classics as part of a compilation album, I Dreamed a Dream: The Hit Songs of Broadway in 2013.
Stephen Moyer performed the song as part of his role as Captain Georg von Trapp during the December 2013 television broadcast of The Sound of Music Live! on NBC.
 The song was frequently performed by The von Trapps, the real life great-grandchildren of the Captain and Maria. It appears on their A Capella album and on their 2014 album, the latter of which is also a duet with Charmian Carr (who played Liesl in the movie).
 A performance by Jeanette Olsson is used as the opening sequence music for the Amazon Original Series The Man in the High Castle.
 Victor Garber, as his character Martin Stein impersonating Max Lorenz in a Nazi-run Parisian nightclub, sang a cover of this song in Legends of Tomorrow.

References

1959 songs
Songs from The Sound of Music
Songs with music by Richard Rodgers
Songs with lyrics by Oscar Hammerstein II
1950s ballads
Songs about flowers